David Bishop (born 27 September 1966), also D. V. Bishop, is a New Zealand comic book editor and writer of comics, novels and screenplays. In 1990s he ran the UK comics titles Judge Dredd Megazine (1991–2002) and 2000 AD (1995–2000).

He has since become a prolific author and received his first drama scriptwriting credit when BBC Radio 4 broadcast his radio play Island Blue: Ronald in June 2006. In 2007, he won the PAGE International Screenwriting Award in the short film category for his script Danny's Toys, and was a finalist in the 2009 PAGE Awards with his script The Woman Who Screamed Butterflies.

Biography
Bishop was sub-editor of the Judge Dredd Megazine and of Crisis, before becoming the editor of the Megazine from 1991 to 2002. He became the editor of 2000 AD just before Christmas 1995, staying four and a half years before resigning to become a freelance writer in the summer of 2000.

Bishop was responsible for discovering many new British talents, including:
Andy Diggle
Robbie Morrison
Siku
Frank Quitely
Dean Ormston
Chris Halls (comics pseudonym of video director Chris Cunningham)
Simon Fraser
Jim Murray

He also edited Judge Dredd – Lawman of the Future and, with collaborator Roger Langridge, contributed the insane asylum-set strip The Straitjacket Fits in the Megazine.

Since leaving 2000 AD in the year 2000, Bishop has enjoyed a successful career as a freelance writer, working on novels of Doctor Who,  Judge Dredd, Heroes and Nikolai Dante, as well as comic strip adventures of The Phantom. His Doctor Who novel Who Killed Kennedy, a journalist's point-of-view on the early Third Doctor stories, is highly popular with fans. Although most of his novels to date have been science fiction, in 2021 his first historical fiction novel was published under the name D. V. Bishop.

Despite his successes as a comics editor and as a writer of prose, Bishop scripted many extremely unpopular comic strips in 2000 AD and the Megazine, including the comics adaptation of A Life Less Ordinary, with art by Steve Yeowell. The Spacegirls, a badly executed parody of the Spice Girls, is on the list of 2000 AD'''s 20 Worst Strips as chosen by fan rating on the official website. His most recent effort — a Fiends of the Eastern Front series for the Megazine — has proven much more popular with readers.

Away from British comics, his work on The Phantom has won awards for the "Best Phantom story of the year" for Egmont on several occasions. Bishop introduced several new important characters to the Phantom mythos, such as the pirate queen Kate Sommerset, which grew so popular with readers that Bishop was able to make her the main character of five stories.

In 2006, Bishop also signed on to participate in the writing of stories for American publisher Moonstone Books' two collections of Phantom short stories, called Phantom Prose Anthologies.

Bishop's history of 2000 AD, in a series of articles under the banner name of Thrill Power Overload, is the most comprehensive currently available. A revised, expanded and updated book version was published in the summer of 2007 to coincide with the 30th anniversary of 2000 AD. After that sold out, a paperback edition was issued in February 2009. An expanded edition with new material by Karl Stock was released in 2017.

In 2008, he appeared on 23 May edition of the BBC One quiz show The Weakest Link, beating eight other contestants to win more than £1500 in prize money.

In 2010, Bishop received his first TV drama credit on the BBC medical drama series Doctors, writing an episode called A Pill For Every Ill, broadcast on 10 February.

In 2021 he released his first historical fiction novel under the name D. V. Bishop, "City of Vengeance".

Bibliography

ComicsThe Straitjacket Fits (with Roger Langridge):
 "The Straitjacket Fits" (in Judge Dredd Megazine #1.09-1.20, 1991–1992)
 "The Final Fit" (in Judge Dredd Yearbook 1993 1992)Soul Sisters (with co-writer Dave Stone and artist Shaky Kane, in Judge Dredd Megazine vol.2 ##2-9 & 1993 Judge Dredd Yearbook, 1992)Strontium Dogs: "Hate & War" (pseudonymous rewrites, in 2000 AD ##993-999, 1996)Vector 13: "Case Ten: Case Closed?" (uncredited, with Simon Davis, in 2000 AD #1032, 1997)B.L.A.I.R. 1: "B.L.A.I.R. 1" (with co-writer Steve MacManus and artist Simon Davis, in 2000 AD #1034, 1997)Dan Dare: "Dan Dare 3000AD" (with co-writer Steve MacManus and artist Kev Walker, in 2000 AD #1034, 1997)Flesh: "Flesh 3000AD" (with co-writer Steve MacManus and artist Carl Critchlow, in 2000 AD #1034, 1997)Harlem Heroes: "Hike Harlem Heroes" (with co-writer Steve MacManus and artist Jason Brashill, in 2000 AD #1034, 1997)Invasion: "Invasion! 3000AD" (with co-writer Steve MacManus and artist Henry Flint, in 2000 AD #1034, 1997)The Spacegirls (development & uncredited co-writer, with Jason Brashill, in 2000 AD ##1062-1066, 1997)A Life Less Ordinary (uncredited, with Steve Yeowell, in 2000 AD ##1063-1070, 1997)Pulp Sci-Fi: "Water of Life" (as "James Stevens", with David Bircham, in 2000 AD #1098, 1998)Past Imperfect: "Nixon Must Die!" (as "James Stevens", with Neil Edwards, in 2000 AD #1315, 2002)Dead Men Walking (as "James Stevens", with Boo Cook, in 2000 AD ##1362-1370, 2003)The Phantom (Swedish Fantomen magazine #26/2001, ##15 & 22/2002, ##8, 16 & 26/2003, ##7, 12, 16, 23, 24 & 26/2004, ##1, 10, 13, 17 & 18/2005, ##8, 9, 16, 19, 20 & 25/2006, ##1, 10, 16, 20 & 26/2007, ##1, 4, 9, 13, 20 & 24/2008,  ##1/2009)Fiends of the Eastern Front: "Stalingrad" (with Colin MacNeil, in Judge Dredd Megazine 245–252, 2006)

Novels
As David BishopJudge Dredd:
 The Savage Amusement (Virgin Books, August 1993)
 Cursed Earth Asylum (Virgin Books, December 1993)
 Silencer (Virgin Books, November 1994)
 Bad Moon Rising (Black Flame, June 2004)
 Kingdom of the Blind (Black Flame, November 2004)Doctor Who:
 Who Killed Kennedy (with "James Stevens", Virgin Books, April 1996)
 Amorality Tale (BBC Books, April 2002)
 The Domino Effect (BBC Books, February 2003)
 Empire of Death (BBC Books, March 2004)Nikolai Dante:
 From Russia with Lust: The Nikolai Dante Omnibus (672 pages, March 2007) collects:
 The Strangelove Gambit (January 2005)
 Imperial Black (August 2005)
 Honour Be Damned (March 2006)A Nightmare on Elm Street: Suffer the Children (Black Flame, May 2005)Fiends of the Eastern Front:
 Fiends of the Eastern Front (672 pages, February 2007) collects:
 Operation Vampyr (December 2005)
 The Blood Red Army (April 2006)
 Twilight of the Dead (August 2006)
 Fiends of the Rising Sun (July 2007)Warhammer Fantasy:
 A Murder in Marienburg (416 pages, Black Library, May 2007)
 A Massacre in Marienburg (416 pages, Black Library, December 2008)

As D. V. Bishop
 City of Vengeance (416 pages, Pan MacMillan, February 2021)

Audio dramasSarah Jane Smith: Buried Secrets (2006, Big Finish Productions)Sarah Jane Smith: Snow Blind (2006, Big Finish Productions)Sarah Jane Smith: Fatal Consequences (2006, Big Finish Productions)Sarah Jane Smith: Dreamland (2006, Big Finish Productions)Sarah Jane Smith: Test of Nerve (2002, Big Finish Productions)Doctor Who Unbound: Full Fathom Five (2003, Big Finish Productions)Doctor Who – Enemy of the Daleks (2009, Big Finish Productions)Sapphire and Steel: All Fall Down (2005, Big Finish Productions)Judge Dredd — Wanted: Dredd or Alive (Big Finish Productions)Judge Dredd — War Crimes (Big Finish Productions)Judge Dredd — Death Trap! (Big Finish Productions)Judge Dredd — The Big Shot! (Big Finish Productions)Judge Dredd — Get Karter! (Big Finish Productions)

BooksThrill Power Overload'' (Rebellion Developments, 260 pages, June 2007)

Notes

References

David Bishop at 2000ad.org

External links
David Bishop's blog

1966 births
Living people
New Zealand comics writers
Comic book editors
British comics writers
British television writers
New Zealand expatriates in the United Kingdom
20th-century British writers
21st-century British writers
20th-century New Zealand writers
20th-century New Zealand male writers
21st-century New Zealand writers
British male television writers